The Life and Death of Cardinal Wolsey is an 1815 book by George Cavendish about Cardinal Thomas Wolsey.

External links
 

1815 non-fiction books
British biographies
Books of Christian biography